It Isn't Being Done This Season' is a 1921 American silent drama film directed by George L. Sargent and starring Corinne Griffith, Sally Crute and Webster Campbell.

Synopsis
Following her mother's advice to marry for money, Marcia turns down Oliver the man she loves to marry the wealthy George Hunt and accompanies him to Turkey on a business trip.

Cast
 Corinne Griffith as Marcia Ventnor
 Sally Crute as Isabelle Ventnor
 Webster Campbell as Oliver Lawton
 John Charles as Afeif Bey
 Charles Wellesley as George Hunt

References

Bibliography
 Connelly, Robert B. The Silents: Silent Feature Films, 1910-36, Volume 40, Issue 2. December Press, 1998.
 Munden, Kenneth White. The American Film Institute Catalog of Motion Pictures Produced in the United States, Part 1. University of California Press, 1997.

External links
 

1921 films
1921 drama films
1920s English-language films
American silent feature films
Silent American drama films
American black-and-white films
Films directed by George L. Sargent
Vitagraph Studios films
Films set in Turkey
1920s American films